SportsNet Central is a daily primetime sports news program that has aired since 1997 on Comcast Sportsnet Philadelphia and its successor NBC Sports Philadelphia

Awards
The show won a Mid-Atlantic Emmy Award in the category "Outstanding Sports Newscast" in 2000, 2001, 2003, 2004 and 2005 and for "Sports: Daily or Weekly Program" in 2015

References

External links
NBC Sports Philadelphia

1997 American television series debuts
1990s American television news shows
2000s American television news shows
2010s American television news shows
Local sports television programming in the United States